Volume Zero or Volume 0 may mean:

 Volume 0, a DVD volume of The Fuccons
 Volume 0: City of Thamesis, part of City of Thamesis
 Genesis 0:0, the volume zero videocassette of Neon Genesis Evangelion
 Slaloms (Lapinot), or Volume 0: Slaloms of The spiffy adventures of McConey
 Sugar Mountain - Live At Canterbury House 1968, or Volume 00 — Sugar Mountain - Live At Canterbury House 1968

See also
 Volume One (disambiguation)
 Volume Two (disambiguation)
 Volume Three (disambiguation)
 Volume Four (disambiguation)
 Volume Five (disambiguation)
 Volume Six (disambiguation)
 Volume Seven (disambiguation)
 Volume Eight (disambiguation)
 Volume Nine (disambiguation)